Boylan Bottling Company is an American gourmet soft drink manufacturer located in New York City. The company was founded in Paterson, New Jersey, in 1891. It was located in Haledon, New Jersey, from the late 1950s until 2001, when its facilities were relocated to Clifton, New Jersey, for a short time before again being relocated to Moonachie, then Teterboro, and, in 2013, New York City. The Boylan brand was registered in 1891. 

Boylan's first product was birch beer, their recipe having been formulated in 1891 in Paterson, New Jersey, by pharmacist Steven William Boylan. Boylan products are known for glass bottles with distinctive, retro style labels. The bottles may come with painted ceramic labels, depending on availability and location.

See also
 List of bottling companies

References

External links

Official website

Drink companies of the United States
American soft drinks
Food and drink companies established in 1891
1891 establishments in New Jersey
Food and drink companies based in New York City